Daska , is a city in the Punjab province of Pakistan. The city is the capital of Daska Tehsil, one of four tehsils of Sialkot District. It is the 50th largest city of Pakistan by population. It is 29th largest by population in Punjab.

History

17th-19th centuries 
Daska was founded during the reign of Shah Jahan, and was initially named Shah Jahanabad, according to Mughal revenue records. It was later renamed Daska as it is das ("ten") koh (Mughal unit of distance) from Sialkot, Pasrur, Gujranwala, and Wazirabad. During the Afghan Durrani invasion of the 18th century, Daska was ruined and its inhabitants forced to seek shelter in the nearby mudfort of Kot Daska. Daska was later repopulated during the Sikh era. Daska was captured by Ranjit Singh in 1802 and made part of the Sikh Empire.

20th century 
In 1929, Daska was the site of Hindu-Sikh riots when Akali Sikhs attempted to seize control of Gurdwara Sant Wayaram Singh. The local Hindu community claimed it was built to be a dharamsala.

In August 1947, 5,000 refugees from surrounding areas gathered at Daska Camp for two weeks before being escorted to the Indian border by the Pakistani Military.

Economy and Geography 
Daska tehsil was once the biggest tehsil in Pakistan, containing almost 400 villages.

There are a number of agricultural machinery manufacturers based in Daska.
Being surrounded by big industrial cities such as Gujranwala and Sialkot, Daska has a very healthy employment rate.
Mughal, Kashmiri, Rajput, Arain, and Malik tribes are prominent in the urban area and several Jatt tribes are in the majority in rural areas.
The Bambawali-Ravi-Bedian Canal flows through its centre which makes the surrounded area fertile and rich in crops.

See also 

Sialkot
Gujranwala
Sambrial
Pasrur
Wazirabad

References

Cities and towns in Sialkot District